Taehwa Market (lit. Taehwa Comprehensive Market) is a traditional street market in Jung-gu, Ulsan, South Korea. The market includes shops that sell fruit, vegetables, meat, fish, breads, clothing, and Korean traditional medicinal items. The market also contains some small restaurants and street-food stalls. In recent years the city government launched an initiative to revive traditional markets, and so in 2011 the market underwent renovations, including the addition of new restroom facilities and parking spaces to provide a more modern feel while still retaining the atmosphere of a traditional market.

See also
 List of markets in South Korea
 List of South Korean tourist attractions

References

Jung District, Ulsan
Retail markets in Ulsan
Food markets in South Korea